Scobura is an Indomalayan genus of grass skippers in the family Hesperiidae.

Species
Scobura cephala  (Hewitson, 1876)  Sikkim to Burma, Thailand
Scobura phiditia  (Hewitson, [1866])  Assam to Burma, Thailand, Laos, Vietnam, Malaysia, Borneo, Sumatra
Scobura isota  (Swinhoe, 1893)  Sikkim to Malaya, Burma, Thailand, Laos, Vietnam
Scobura woolletti   (Riley, 1923)  Burma, Thailand, Laos, Malaysia, Borneo
Scobura tytleri   (Evans, 1914)  Manipur
Scobura cephaloides  (de Nicéville, [1889])  Burma, Assam, Tonkin
S. c. kinka  Evans, 1949  Burma, Thailand, Laos, Vietnam, Hainan
Scobura coniata  Hering, 1918  China
Scobura eximia   Devyatkin, 2002  Vietnam

Biology 
The larvae of Scobura coniata feed on  Gramineae including Indocalamus

References

Natural History Museum Lepidoptera genus database

External links
Funet

Hesperiinae
Hesperiidae genera